Quantum inequalities are local constraints on the magnitude and extent of distributions of negative energy density in space-time. Initially conceived to clear up a long-standing problem in quantum field theory (namely, the potential for unconstrained negative energy density at a point), quantum inequalities have proven to have a diverse range of applications.

The form of the quantum inequalities is reminiscent of the uncertainty principle.

Energy conditions in classical field theory

Einstein's theory of General Relativity amounts to a description of the relationship between the curvature of space-time, on the one hand, and the distribution of matter throughout space-time on the other. This precise details of this relationship are determined by the Einstein equations

.

Here, the Einstein tensor  describes the curvature of space-time, whilst the energy–momentum tensor  describes the local distribution of matter. ( is a constant.) The Einstein equations express local relationships between the quantities involved—specifically, this is a system of coupled non-linear second order partial differential equations.

A very simple observation can be made at this point: the zero-point of energy-momentum is not arbitrary. Adding a "constant" to the right-hand side of the Einstein equations will effect a change in the Einstein tensor, and thus also in the curvature properties of space-time.

All known classical matter fields obey certain "energy conditions". The most famous classical energy condition is the "weak energy condition"; this asserts that the local energy density, as measured by an observer moving along a time-like world line, is non-negative. The weak energy condition is essential for many of the most important and powerful results of classical relativity theory—in particular, the singularity theorems of Hawking et al.

Energy conditions in quantum field theory

The situation in quantum field theory is rather different: the expectation value of the energy density can be negative at any given point. In fact, things are even worse: by tuning the state of the quantum matter field, the expectation value of the local energy density can be made arbitrarily negative.

Inequalities

For free, massless, minimally coupled scalar fields, for all  the following inequality holds along any inertial observer worldline with velocity  and proper time :

Similar bounds can be constructed for massive scalar or electromagnetic fields. Related theorems imply that pulses of negative energy need to be compensated by a larger positive pulse (with magnitude growing with increasing pulse separation).

Note that the inequality above only applies to inertial observers: for accelerated observers weaker or no bounds entail.

Applications

Distributions of negative energy density comprise what is often referred to as exotic matter, and allow for several intriguing possibilities: for example, the Alcubierre drive potentially allows for faster-than-light space travel.

Quantum inequalities constrain the magnitude and space-time extent of negative energy densities. In the case of the Alcubierre warp drive mentioned above, the quantum inequalities predict that the amount of exotic matter required to create and sustain the warp drive "bubble" far exceeds the total mass-energy of the universe.

History

The earliest investigations into quantum inequalities were carried out by Larry Ford and Tom Roman; an early collaborator was Mitch Pfenning, one of Ford's students at Tufts University. Important work was also carried out by Eanna Flanagan. More recently, Chris Fewster (of the University of York, in the UK) has applied rigorous mathematics to produce a variety of quite general quantum inequalities. Collaborators have included Ford, Roman, Pfenning, Stefan Hollands and Rainer Verch.

Further reading

Websites

Quantum field theory on curved spacetime at the Erwin Schrödinger Institute

Quantum Energy Inequalities (University of York, UK)

References

Quantum field theory